Pyay District is a district of the Bago Region in central Burma (Myanmar). The capital lies at Pyay.

Townships 
Padaung Township
Pyay Township
Paukkaung Township
Shwedaung Township
Paungde Township
Thegon Township

References 

 
Districts of Myanmar
Bago Region